Hakea ulicina, commonly known as furze hakea, is a shrub in the family Proteaceae and endemic to Victoria.  It has stiff, long, narrow leaves and creamy-white flowers.

Description

Taxonomy and naming
Hakea ulicina was first formally described by Robert Brown in Supplementum primum prodromi florae Novae Hollandiae in 1830, based on plant material collected by William Baxter in Wilsons Promontory. Named from the Latin ulex for the genus of plants which includes furze (Ulex europaeus), and believed to be a resemblance to the habit or the leaves of this species.

Distribution and habitat
Furze hakea  occurs on the southern slopes of the Great Dividing Range as well as in coastal heathland. It is mostly found from the east of Port Phillip Bay in Victoria through to Eden in south-eastern New South Wales. Additional populations occur in the Brisbane Ranges and Anglesea to the west of Port Phillip Bay, as well as Tasmania's Furneaux Group of islands. A similar species from South Australia and western Victoria, Hakea repullulans, can be distinguished by its broader leaves and presence of a lignotuber.

Conservation status
Hakea ulicina is listed as "vulnerable" under the Tasmanian Government Threatened Species Protection Act 1995.

References

ulicina
Flora of New South Wales
Flora of Tasmania
Flora of Victoria (Australia)
Plants described in 1830
Taxa named by Robert Brown (botanist, born 1773)